The Arroyo of Paradise brucie (Brucepattersonius paradisus), also known as the Arroyo of Paradise akodont is a South American rodent species of the family Cricetidae. It is known only from northeastern Argentina. No population data is available for the species; it is threatened by deforestation and has not been found in any protected area.

References

Mammals of Argentina
Brucepattersonius
Mammals described in 2000